The Islamic Victory Force (or AKUI) was an Islamic political party in Indonesia. The party was based in Madura. In the 1955 parliamentary election, AKUI got 81,454 votes (0.2% of the national vote). One parliamentarian was elected from the party.

References

Defunct political parties in Indonesia
Islamic political parties in Indonesia
Liberal democracy period in Indonesia
Madura Island
Political parties with year of disestablishment missing
Political parties with year of establishment missing